Kusile Power Station (formerly known as the Bravo Power Station) in South Africa is a coal-fired power plant by state electricity utility Eskom in Mpumalanga.

Location
Located about 15 kilometres north of the existing Kendal Power Station near Witbank, Mpumalanga.

Original concept
Kusile Power Station is designed to consist of six 800 megawatt coal-fired generating units for a total generating capacity of 4,800 megawatts. This station would be the first in Eskom's fleet with flue gas desulphurization technology.

Project engineer
Black and Veatch was appointed as the project engineer for construction.

Main equipment suppliers
Alstom provided the steam turbines, whilst Hitachi would provide the super critical boilers.

Coal supply

The power utility, Eskom stated that it "will obtain most of the coal required for this Power Station from Anglo Coal's New Largo operations, south east of the Kusile Power Station."

Eskom's consultants estimate that 35 new coal mines will be required to support the Medupi and Kusile plants.

Construction timeline
Initially expected to take 6 years to complete, the project was not expected to complete Unit 1 until 2017 (approximately 8 years after initial works began) and the entire project not until 2021.

 5 June 2007: Department of Environmental Affairs & Tourism issued a positive Record of Decision.
 February 2008: Hitachi Power Africa awarded the boiler contract worth R18.5 billion. "
 February 2008: Alstom S&E awarded the turbine island works contract valued at R13 billion. "
 14 April 2011: Black & Veatch Corp. Awarded approval for $805.6 million in financing from the U.S. Export-Import Bank.
 31 May 2011:Export-Import Bank of the United States approves $805 million (R5.78 billion) loan.
 October 2014: 300 ton 910 MVA Generator Step-up Transformer placed on its foundation, assembled with all its Auxiliary systems and filled with 128 000 Litres of Mineral Oil. All Electrical integrity tests were performed successfully to confirm that the transformer was ready to receive power.
 10 March 2017: Unit 1 achieves commercial power.
 7 July 2017: Unit 2 was synchronised to the national grid.
 16 March 2019: Unit 3 was synchronised to the national grid.
 30 October 2020: Unit 2 reaches commercial operation.
 31 March 2021: Unit 3 reaches commercial operation.
 23 December 2021: Unit 4 connected to the national grid.
 31 May 2022: Unit 4 reaches commercial operation

Delays and defects
The dates for full commercial operation were shifted numerous times mostly due to:

 Labour disputes:
 May 2011: Eleven contractor vehicles, seven offices, two large mobile cranes, and the west wing of the KCW office block were set alight, vehicles stoned, and offices and stores looted.
 February 2014: 1400 employees reported absent.
 10 August 2018: A fire breaks out at the station amidst tensions with unions over pay increases causing damage.
Technical issues such as:
 Boiler design: high temperatures that the spray water-cooling system could not cope with 
 Fabric filter plant: excessive wear of bags, resulting in blockages 
 Coal mills: not meeting operational requirements, therefore requiring a doubling of servicing 
 Flue ducts: collapse of a flue duct, rendering Units 1, 2 & 3 inoperable 

This resulted in Kusile and Medupi considered as some of the worst-performing units in Eskom's fleet. In February 2019, Eskom GM for group technology Titus Mathe reported R8 billion would be needed to fix design defects at Medupi and Kusile.

Critics
The building of this power station attracted various criticism.

Interference
Hitachi Power Africa, a subsidiary of Hitachi, Ltd., found by the U.S. Securities and Exchange Commission to have made US$6 million in corrupt payments to Chancellor House, a front company for the African National Congress, the ruling political party in South Africa. Hitachi agreed to pay US$19 million to settle charges. Hitachi Power Africa rebranded as Mitsubishi Hitachi Power Systems Africa in February 2014.

Cost
Kusile Power Station is estimated to cost R118 billion to complete.

Financial institution support
The following institutions were involved in supporting the project:
African Development Bank
Development Bank of Southern Africa
Bank of America
Bank of Tokyo Mitsubishi UFJ (now MUFG Bank)
Barclays
BNP Paribas
Crédit Agricole
Crédit Industriel et Commercial
Credit Suisse
Deutsche Bank
FirstRand
HSBC
JPMorgan Chase
KfW IPEX-Bank
Natixis
Nedbank
Rand Merchant Bank
Société Générale
Standard Bank (South Africa)
Compagnie Française d'Assurance pour le Commerce Extérieur (COFACE)
Euler Hermes
Export–Import Bank of the United States
Public Investment Corporation (South Africa)

Emissions
The plant is expected to emit est 36.8 million tonnes of -equivalent per year once completed.

In November 2011, Greenpeace activists chained themselves to a gate and climbed a crane, a few weeks before the country hosted a global conference on climate change. Authorities arrested nine people, on charges of trespassing and malicious damage to property.

The design of the station does allow for the installation of flue gas desulphurization technology, the first of its kind in South Africa.

Inquiry
By 2018, the governments Public Enterprises Minister Pravin Gordhan announced a forensic probe into delays and cost overruns on the completion of Kusile and Medupi Control Stations.

Corruption controversy 
In November 2019 South African investigative journalist Pieter-Louis Myburgh published an article in the Daily Maverick detailing an alleged slush fund corruption scandal involving Eskom executives and at least four contractors. The scandal involved contracts worth a combined R10 billion resulting in an estimated R75 million being lost due to irregular activities. By the time of the publication of Myburgh's article the construction of Kusile was five years past its original completion date and an estimated R80 billion (equivalent to US$5.4 billion) over budget.

See also 

 List of coal power stations
 List of largest power stations in the world
 List of power stations in South Africa

References 

Coal-fired power stations in South Africa
Proposed coal-fired power stations
Proposed power stations in South Africa
Buildings and structures in Mpumalanga
Economy of Mpumalanga
Emalahleni Local Municipality, Mpumalanga